Hodi da ti čiko nešto da is the eighth studio album by Bosnian rock band Zabranjeno Pušenje, released through Civitas in Bosnia and Herzegovina on November 16, 2006, and Croatia on March 15, 2007 and through Mascom Records in Serbia in 2007. Moreover, Hodi da ti čiko nešto da is the second double-full-length studio album released by the band. The double-album subtitles are Se kličem Mujo and Se kličem Suljo.

Track listing
Source: Discogs

Notes
 "Pravo zajebani DJ iz Chicaga" contains voice sample of George W. Bush, the 43rd President of the United States
 "Biffe Neretva" contains voice sample of actress Lucija Šerbedžija, speaking in Ukrainian

Personnel 
Credits adapted from the album's liner notes.

Zabranjeno Pušenje
Sejo Sexon – lead vocals, guitar
Robert Boldižar – violin, keyboards, backing vocals
Branko Trajkov Trak – drums, percussion, backing vocals
Predrag Bobić Bleka – bass
Toni Lović – electric guitar, acoustic guitar
Paul Kempf – keyboards

Production
 Sejo Sexon – production
 Denis Mujadžić Denyken – music production, recording, mastering
 Dario Vitez – executive production

Design
 Tarik Zahirović – design and layout (Ideologija Creative Agency in Sarajevo, BIH)
Saša Midžor Sučić – photos
Denis Lovrović – photos

Additional musicians

Arsen Dedić – conductor (track 1-10)
Bruno Urlić – violin (tracks 1-06, 1-10)
Sakin Modronja – vocals (track 1-09)
Irena Mujadžić – backing vocals
Jelena Vučetić – backing vocals
Nina Sučić – viola (track 1-10)
Stanislav Kovačić – cello (track 1-10)
Marijan Jakić – saxophone (Brass section)
Antonio Janković – trombone (Brass section)
Tomica Rukljić – trumpet (Brass section)
Krešimir Oreški – djembe 
Ismet Kurtović – vocal choir contractor, choir
Aida Kočo – choir
Aldijana Mujić – choir
Alma Srebreniković – choir
Amina Omanović – choir
Azra Grabčanović – choir
Belma Hadžović – choir
Boris Turina – choir
Dženana Čaušević – choir
Emina Nuhbegović – choir
Galija Hammad – choir
Melisa Huskić – choir
Nimer Hammad – choir
Sakin Modronja – choir
Selma Srebreniković – choir

Awards and nominations 

|-
| rowspan="8" | 2007 || Hodi da ti čiko nešto da
| Rock Album of the Year
| rowspan="8" | Davorin
| 
| 
| 
|-
| rowspan="2" |"Dobro dvorište"
| Rock Song of the Year
| 
| 
| 
|-
| Rock Music Video of the Year
| 
| 
| 
|-
| rowspan="2" |"Nema više"
| Rock Song of the Year
| 
| 
| 
|-
| Rock Music Video of the Year
| 
| 
| 
|-
| Zabranjeno pušenje
| Rock Performer of the Year
| 
| 
| 
|-
| Sejo Sexon
| Best Male Singer
| 
| 
| 
|-
| Zabranjeno pušenje & Arsen Dedić
| Collaboration of the Year
| 
| 
| 
|-

References

2006 albums
Zabranjeno Pušenje albums